The brasserie Lancelot is a French brewery founded in 1990 by Bernard Lancelot, located on the site of a gold mine in Roc-Saint-André in Morbihan. It produces seven top-fermented, unfiltered, naturally-produced and unpasteurised beers, named after figures from the history and literature of Brittany. It is one of the main brewery in the west part of France with a production of 30 000 hectoliters per year. It is the number one local beer in Brittany on-trade and number two off trade.

Beers

La Blanche Hermine

La Duchesse Anne
This beer is named after Anne of Brittany.

Cervoise Lancelot

Les Bonnets Rouges
This beer is named after the revolt of the bonnets rouges.

Telenn Du
This beer is brewed from barley and buckwheat. Pioneer of buckwheat beers, its name means "black harp" in Breton. It sported a picture of a black harp at its beginnings, but after protests from Guinness, it was replaced by a white triskelion.

XI.I

This beer is named after Samhain (eleventh month of the year, first day). It's a dark barley wine, very alcoholic for a beer (11.1 ABV) and with a very strong flavour.

Pays de Cocagne

Other products
Lancelot also sells the Breizh Cola, the chouchen Lancelot, and in 2006 began production of the organic Morgane beer, marketed as "100% Breton and 100% organic".

References

Breweries of France
Companies based in Brittany